Choline transporter-like protein 1 is a protein that in humans is encoded by the SLC44A1 gene.

See also 
 Cluster of differentiation
 Solute carrier family

References

Further reading

External links 
 

Solute carrier family
Clusters of differentiation